The Olongapo Volunteers were a professional basketball team in the Metropolitan Basketball Association in 2002.  In its only season in the league, the Volunteers made the semifinals of the tournament.

History
In 2002, the Olongapo Volunteers became the eighth member of the MBA after the departure of the Nueva Ecija Patriots. The team was managed by Mayor Katherine Gordon and later, by Senator Richard Gordon.

Junel Baculi, who steered Hapee Toothpaste and Welcoat to PBL titles was hired as the head coach and nabbed several former PBA veterans such as Johnadel Cardel, Joel Dualan, Henry Fernandez as well as former PBL veterans Eugene Tan, Kerwin McCoy, Brixter Encarnacion and Calijohn Orfecio. Fil-am Jeff Flowers was also signed by the expansion ballclub.

In the MBA First Conference, Olongapo held the best record in the Northern Conference with a 7–3 record, and a home game in the semifinals against the LBC-Batangas Blades.  However, the Blades escaped with a 76–75 victory to advance to the championship round against the eventual champions the RCPI-Negros Slashers.

Olongapo was renamed as the Gilbey's-Olongapo Volunteers, but the league folded in the middle of the second conference.

Roster
 Bob Allen
 Jerome Barbosa
 Johnedel Cardel
 Joel Dualan
 Brixter Encarnacion
 Henry Fernandez
 Jeffrey Flowers
 Julius Gonzales
Bern Gozon
 Kerwin McCoy
 Calijohn Orfrecio
 Allen Glenn Patrimonio
 Topex Robinson
 Eugene Tan
 Ricky Vinoya

References

Basketball teams established in 2002
Metropolitan Basketball Association teams
Basketball teams disestablished in 2002
Sports in Zambales
2002 establishments in the Philippines
2002 disestablishments in the Philippines